Francisco de Asís Monterde García Icazbalceta (August 9, 1894 in Mexico City – February 27, 1985 in Mexico City) was a prolific and multifaceted Mexican writer whose career spanned over fifty years. He was an important promoter of the arts and culture in Mexico in the years following the Revolution.

Bibliography
His parents were Francisco de Asís Ángel María Monterde y Adalid and María Trinidad de los Dolores García Icazbalceta y Travesi de Monterde, aristocrats who both died when he was still young. He studied  dentistry but never practiced. In 1924 he founded and edited the short-lived Mexican avant-garde cultural magazine Antena. In 1925 he famously deciphered a letter that conquistador Hernán Cortés left written in code. He wrote, in addition to plays and poetry, various novels set in colonial Mexico, a genre known as colonialista. In 1930 he created in conjunction with Alejandro Gómez Arias, the department of Mexican and Hispano-American Literature at the National Preparatory School. He was a founding member in 1938 of the Asociación Mexicana de Críticos de Teatro (AMCT). He belonged to the "grupo de los siete autores" (group of seven authors), a circle of dramatists active in the 1950s who revived the theatrical arts in Mexico. He was an admirer of José Juan Tablada and an imitator of the latter's haiku-inspired poetry (a style at the time referred to as haikai). He held important posts in the Ministry of Public Education. He was from 1922-65  a professor of Spanish and Latin-American literature at the Universidad Nacional Autónoma de México (UNAM), his alma mater (M.A. 1941, Ph.D. 1942). He served as subdirector of the Biblioteca Nacional de México; as head librarian of the Museo Nacional de Antropología e Historia (1931); and as director of the Imprenta Universitaria de la UNAM (UNAM University Press). He was director of the Centro Mexicano de Escritores from 1973-85.

Monterde was a numerary member (seat 2) of the Academia Mexicana de la Lengua and served as its director from 1960-72.

Awards
Premio Nacional de Ciencias y Artes (1975)

Published works
(list not comprehensive)
Los virreyes de la Nueva España. Síntesis de la época colonial (1922)
Itinerario contemplativo (1923)
En el remolino: drama (1924)
La hermana pobreza : novela mexicana inédita (1925)
Manuel Gutierrez Nájera (1925)
La que volvío a la vida (comedia en tres actos) (1926)
Oro Negro (1927)
Amado Nervo (1929)
Antología de poetas y prosistas hispanoamericanos modernos (1931)
Bibliografía del teatro en México (1933)
Don Juan Ruiz de Alarcón (1939)
Navarrete y sus Poesias profanas (1939)
Guillermo Prieto y la "Musa callejera (1940)
Algunos puntos oscuros en la vida de Salvador Díaz Mirón (1940)
Fábulas sin moraleja y finales de cuentos (1942)
El pensamiento de Bolívar (1943)
Novelistas hispanoamericanos (del prerromanticismo a la iniciación del realismo) (1943)
Proteo : fábula (1944)
Cultura mexicana aspectos literarios (1946)
Anales de los Xahil de los indios Cakchiqueles (other contributors: Georges Raynaud; Miguel Ángel Asturias; J. M. González de Mendoza; Francisco Hernández Arana Xajila; Francisco Díaz Gebuta Queh) (1946)
Moctezuma: el de la silla de oro (1947)
Chapultepec: poema (1947)
La careta de cristal: comedia en tres actos (1948)
Tres comedias : Apostolado en las Indias y martirio de un cacique, Si el amor excede al arte, ni amor ni arte a la prudencia, La pérdida de España (Eusebio Vela; Jefferson Rea Spell; Francisco Monterde) (1948)
Una evasión romántica de Fernando Calderón : [discurso de recepción como académico de número en la Academia Mexicana] (1952)
Dos comedias Mexicanas (1953)
Teatro indígena prehispánico (Rabinal Achí) (1955) (editor)
Teatro mexicano del siglo XX (1956) (co-written with Manuel José Othón)
Salvador Díaz Mirón: documentos, estética (1956)
Presente involuntario : evocación dramática en tres entrevistas (1957)
La dignidad de don Quijote (1959)
Cuaderno de estampas (1961)
Netsuke haikai (1962)
Sakura, tercinas del Oriente Remoto (1963)
Una moneda de oro y otros cuentos (1965)
Moctezuma II, Senor del Anahuac (1966)
Historia de la literatura española, e Historia de la literatura mexicana (1966) (co-written with Guillermo Díaz-Plaja)
Momentos de Oaxaca (1967)
El madrigal de Cetina (1968)
18 novelas de "El Universal ilustrado" 1922-1925 (1969)
Páginas escogidas (relatos, estampas, narraciones, cuentos, novela y novela corta) (1969)
Cortejo de sombras (1971)
Diccionario Porrúa de la lengua española (1972)
Mariano Azuela y la crítica mexicana : estudios, artículos y resenas (1973)
Aspectos literarios de la cultura mexicana : poetas y prosistas del siglo XVI a nuestros días (1975)
Cumbres de la poesía mexicana en los siglos XIX y XX (1977)
El temor de Hernán Cortés: y otras narraciones de la Nueva España (1980)
Salvador Díaz Mirón, el hombre y su obra (1984)

Notes

References
(English) Cortés, Eladio, Dictionary of Mexican Literature. Westport, Connecticut: Greenwood Press, 1992.
(English) Zelson, Louis G., "Francisco Monterde (1894-)", The Americas, Vol. 10, No. 2 (Oct., 1953), pp. 159–178.
(Spanish) Ocampo de Gómez, Aurora Maura, Diccionario de escritores mexicanos, siglo XX : desde las generaciones del Ateneo y novelistas de la Revolución hasta nuestros días. Mexico: Universidad Nacional Autónoma de México, Instituto de Investigaciones Filológicas, Centro de Estudios Literarios, 1988

External links
(English) Francisco Monterde
(Spanish) Noventa años de Francisco Monterde por José Emilio Pacheco
(Spanish) Necrología de Francisco Monterde in El País

Historians of Mexico
Members of the Mexican Academy of Language
Mexican dramatists and playwrights
Mexican educators
Mexican essayists
Male essayists
20th-century Mexican historians
Mexican male novelists
Mexican male poets
Mexican male short story writers
Mexican short story writers
National Autonomous University of Mexico alumni
Academic staff of the National Autonomous University of Mexico
Writers from Mexico City
Philologists
1894 births
1985 deaths
20th-century Mexican poets
20th-century Mexican novelists
20th-century Mexican dramatists and playwrights
Mexican male dramatists and playwrights
20th-century short story writers
20th-century essayists
20th-century Mexican male writers